The Battle of the Visayas (1899) was fought between the Philippine revolutionaries and the United States from March 10, 1899 to March 5, 1901 and this is part of the Philippine–American War. The battle was waged to capture the Visayas region in the Philippine Islands by the Americans.

References

See also
 Negros Revolution
 History of the Philippines

Battles of the Philippine–American War
20th-century conflicts